Paratragon is a genus of longhorn beetles of the subfamily Lamiinae, containing the following species:

 Paratragon jadoti Téocchi & Sudre, 2002
 Paratragon tragonoides (Lepesme, 1953)

References

Pachystolini